Gildardo García (9 March 1954 – 15 January 2021) was a Colombian chess player.

Biography
García became Colombia's second Grandmaster in 1992. His highest rating was 2540 (in July 1994) and he was ranked 14th in Colombia at the time of his death.

He won the Colombian national championship 10 times, in 1977, 1978, 1985, 1986, 1987, 1990, 1991, 1995, 2003, and 2006. In 1974, he won the inaugural Pan American Junior Chess Championship. In 2006, he played in the chess olympiads for Colombia.

He died from COVID-19 in Medellín on 15 January 2021, during the COVID-19 pandemic in Colombia.

References 

1954 births
2021 deaths
Colombian chess players
Chess grandmasters
Deaths from the COVID-19 pandemic in Colombia
20th-century Colombian people
21st-century Colombian people